Jupiter is the second full-length album by the alternative/metal band Cave In, released in summer 2000. It marked a change in the band's style, as this album saw the band move away from their previous hardcore sound by starting to experiment with more elements of space rock and psychedelic rock, with "Big Riff" being the only song on the album to contain screamed vocals.

There are 4 different tints to the album cover; green (initial release), magenta (second press), blue (third press), and yellow (fourth press).

In December 2009, Decibel magazine named Jupiter the second best metal album of the decade. In 2020, it was named one of the 20 best metal albums of 2000 by Metal Hammer magazine.

Track listing

Personnel 
Stephen Brodsky – guitar and vocals
John-Robert Conners – drums
Adam McGrath – guitar
Caleb Scofield – bass guitar and vocals
Brian McTiernan – producer

References

2000 albums
Cave In albums
Albums produced by Brian McTernan
Hydra Head Records albums